Mark Cochran is an American politician. He represents District 23 in the Tennessee House of Representatives. He was elected as part of the 111th general assembly in November 2018.  He was preceded by Republican representative John W. Forgety. District 23 encompasses McMinn County and parts of Monroe County.  Cochran began serving as the treasurer for the Tennessee State House of Representatives in 2019.

Early life
Cochran's family roots in the town of Englewood, Tennessee date back seven generations to the 1850s when his ancestors established a small farm. He grew up tending cattle and bagging groceries in his parents' store. He is a devout Christian and conservative.

From 2004-2008, Cochran attended the University of Tennessee in Knoxville where he earned a Masters Degree in Public Administration with a grade point average of 4.0. Following this, he remained at the University of Tennessee for one more year, to 2009, to earn a Bachelors in Broadcast Journalism, continuing to maintain a 4.0 GPA.

Mark is the younger cousin of Macey Holden Garkovich.

Career 
In 2010, Cochran worked as a staff assistant in the office of former senator Bob Corker who held office from 2007-2019. Also starting in 2010, he became an assistant to the McMinn County Mayor's Office. In 2015 he served as the campaign manager for Jason Zachary who ran for state representative for District 14, and defeated Scott Hacker with 72.9% or the vote. As of 2015 Cochran also served as a board member on the Board of Funeral Directors and Embalmers.

2018 Election 
In the general election for District 23 of the Tennessee House of Representatives, Mark Cochran (R) defeated Brad Hartley (D). 

Preceding the general election, on August 2, 2018 Cochran won the Republican primary election against Donald Winder III for Tennessee House of Representatives District 23.

Committees
Cochran presently is a member on the following legislative committees: Education, Curriculum (Testing, and Innovation Subcommittees), Consumer and Human Resource Committee, (Consumer Subcommittee).

References

1985 births
University of Tennessee alumni
Living people
Republican Party members of the Tennessee House of Representatives
21st-century American politicians